Wendy McNamara (born January 26, 1970) is an American politician who has served in the Indiana House of Representatives from the 76th district since 2010.

References

1970 births
Living people
Republican Party members of the Indiana House of Representatives
Women state legislators in Indiana
21st-century American politicians
21st-century American women politicians
People from Mount Vernon, Indiana